Victory is the fourth studio album by Puerto Rican reggaeton artist Wisin. Released under Sony Music Latin on December 1, 2017.

Track listing

Charts

Certifications

References

Wisin albums
2017 albums
Sony Music albums